Donald Reid Womack (born 1966) is a composer of contemporary classical music. He was born in Virginia, raised in East Tennessee and studied at Furman University and Northwestern University, receiving degrees in philosophy, music theory, and music composition.

He has composed approximately 100 works for orchestra, chamber ensembles, solo instruments, and voice. Major works include a concerto for shakuhachi, koto and orchestra (After), two gayageum concertos (Scattered Rhythms and 무노리 Mu Nori), a haegeum concerto (Dancing With Spirits 혼무), a violin concerto (In questi tempi di Conflitto), a viola concerto (Blue Ridge Seasons), an oratorio for chorus and chamber orchestra (Voices of Kalaupapa), and a triple concerto for shakuhachi, biwa and koto with ensemble of Japanese instruments (Three Trees 三木).

Womack's influences meld a broad range of sources, including post-minimalism, rock, bluegrass, and especially intercultural elements — in particular East Asian instruments. He spent a year in Tokyo, Japan studying Japanese instruments, as well as extensive time in Seoul, South Korea learning Korean music, and has composed nearly 40 works for Japanese, Korean and Chinese instruments in various combinations.

His music has been described as "original, creative and ingenious" (Shimbun Akahata), "powerful and impressively crafted" and "eclectic but also distinctive" (Honolulu Star-Bulletin), "raw energy alternating with a brooding potentiality" (Honolulu Advertiser), "wonderfully mellow and sprightly in its metrical incisiveness" (Buffalo NY Daily News), "capable of providing stimulus for a new century" (Neue Musikzeitung), and as having "the concentration of a haiku." (Classical CD Review)

Womack’s works have been performed throughout the U.S., as well as in many countries in Europe, Asia, Oceania, South America and Africa by such ensembles as the Tokyo Metropolitan Symphony Orchestra, Louisville Orchestra, Honolulu Symphony, Changwon Philharmonic, National Orchestra of Korea, KBS Traditional Korean Orchestra, Seoul National Gugak Orchestra, Busan National Gugak Orchestra, Pittsburgh New Music Ensemble, Contemporary Music Ensemble Korea, Pro Music Nipponia (日本音楽集団), and AURA-J.

Among his awards are a Guggenheim Fellowship, a Fulbright Research Fellowship, winner of the Gyeonggi Korean Orchestra International Composition Competition, First Prize in the Sigma Alpha Iota Inter-American Music Awards, two Individual Artist Fellowships from the Hawaii State Foundation on Culture and the Arts, and an Excellence in Research Award from the University of Hawaii. Since 1994 Womack has resided in Honolulu, Hawaii, where he is professor of music composition and theory, and a faculty member of the Center for Japanese Studies and the Center for Korean Studies at the University of Hawaii.

References 

Honolulu Star-Bulletin, March 30, 2003 (retrieved December 7, 2008)
Honolulu Star-Bulletin, May 24, 2001 (retrieved December 7, 2008)
Donald Reid Womack profile at the University of Hawaii (retrieved December 7, 2008)

External links
Official website
University of Hawaii Music Department website

1966 births
Living people
21st-century classical composers
American male classical composers
American classical composers
Furman University alumni
Bienen School of Music alumni
21st-century American composers
Classical musicians from Virginia
21st-century American male musicians